Abondant is a commune in the Eure-et-Loir department in northern France.

History
It is located 10 km north east of Dreux on the D147 road. The l'Avre aqueduct passes to the north of the commune. The Château d'Abondant dates from the reign of Louis XIII and is now a care home. It was previously owned by banker Henry Herman Harjes, Baron Jules de Koenigswarter and his wife, the former Pannonica Rothschild.

Population

See also
Communes of the Eure-et-Loir department

References

Communes of Eure-et-Loir